The Balkans Cup was an international football competition for clubs from Albania, Bulgaria, Greece, Romania, Turkey, and Yugoslavia. It was introduced in 1961 and was very popular in the 1960s (the 1967 final attracted 42,000 spectators), being the second most important international club competition for clubs from the region (after the European Champions' Cup in which the champions could play; the UEFA Cup Winners' Cup originally attracted few teams from the region as many did not organise domestic cups regularly and only Yugoslavia had significant representation in the Fairs Cup). The competition has been dominated by Bulgaria-based teams. The Bulgarian teams have won together a total number of 9 titles.

It later declined after Balkan clubs obtained more representation in the two minor UEFA competitions, in contrast to the (much older but also defunct) Balkan Cup for national teams.

Editions 
 Finals on Home and Away basis, except noted otherwise.
 a → first leg of the final

 Competition's formats:
 type-A: One group of 5 clubs.
 type-B: Two groups of 4, top clubs qualifying for the final.
 type-C: Two groups of 3, top clubs qualifying for the final.
 type-D: One group of 3 clubs.
 type-E: Knock-out (Quarterfinals → Semifinals → Final).
 type-F: Two groups of 3 and one group of 4, top clubs plus the best runner-up qualifying for the Knock-out Semifinals.
 type-G: Knock-out (Preliminary round qualifying 2 clubs out of 4 → Semifinals → Final).
 type-H: Knock-out (Preliminary round qualifying 1 club out of 2 → Semifinals → Final).
 type-I: Knock-out (Semifinals → Final).

Performances

By club 
When sorted by year of winning or losing final(s), the table is sorted by the year of each club's first final.

 All 24 Clubs (out of 89 in total) that appeared in the Balkans Cup for 3 times or more, eventually Reached the Final with the exception of: Galatasaray (5 entries) and Beşiktaş (3) of Turkey, Vllaznia Shkodër (3) of Albania and Universitatea Craiova (3) of Romania.
 Beroe Stara Zagora of Bulgaria is competition's Record Holder concerning participation (7 entries), finals reached (4, plus one top spot in group) and wins (4), while in their single lost final against Partizani for 1970 edition, they opted not showing up in Tirana for the return leg of a 1–1 draw at home.
 Next to Beroe's 4, their compatriots Slavia Sofia reached 3 Finals (2 wins), while Romanian Argeş Piteşti had 2 (no win), plus one runner-up spot in group (each time they entered the competition, ended up in the losing side).
 6 clubs won Balkans Cup in their Single Entry: Dinamo Zagreb (Yugoslavia, now Croatia) in 1976, Panathinaikos Athens (Greece) in 1977, Velež Mostar (Yugoslavia, now Bosnia and Herzegovina) in 1980–81, Inter Sibiu (Romania) in 1990–91, Sarıyer İstanbul (Turkey) in 1991–92 and Edessaikos Edessa (Greece) in 1992–93 edition.

By country 
Clubs from Bosnia and Herzegovina, Croatia, North Macedonia, Montenegro and Serbia competed as part of SFR Yugoslavia.

Top performer by country:

Participation

By club 
In the 33 years of its existence, a total of 89 clubs from 6 countries appeared in the 28 Balkans Cup editions. Two of them, both Turkish, withdrawn their participation before playing a single match: Zonguldakspor in 1980–81 and Trabzonspor in 1986.
Sides with 4 entries or more:

By country 
Bulgarian and Turkish sides were present at each one of the 28 Balkans Cup editions, while Yugoslavian were absent 9 times in total, entering just twice during its last decade of existence (ironically, reaching both finals). Generally, South Slavs (both Football Association and clubs) were never keen supporters of the competition, as they had neither been enthusiastic about the national teams' Balkan Cup, too.
{| class="wikitable" style="text-align:center" cellspacing="15" cellpadding="15"
|-
| colspan="2" | 
| bgcolor="#f1f1f1" | Bulgaria
| bgcolor="#f1f1f1" | Turkey
| bgcolor="#f1f1f1" | Romania
| bgcolor="#f1f1f1" | Greece
| bgcolor="#f1f1f1" | Albania
| bgcolor="#f1f1f1" | Yugoslavia
|-style="border-bottom: 3px solid grey;"
| colspan="2" align=left | Number of different sides that entered || 15 || 17 || 18 || 15 || 12 || 12 
|-
| colspan="8" align=left | Editions of Balkans Cup that
|-
| [1] || align=left | Country was represented by at least one club || 28 || 28 || 27 || 27 || 26 || 20 
|-
| [2] || align=left | Country's club withdrew before playing a match|| — || 5 || — || 1 || — || 1 
|-
| [3] || align=left | Country was still represented by another club || — || 1 || — || 1 || — || — 
|-bgcolor="ccffcc"
| [4] || align=left | Country's clubs competed (=[1]-[2]+[3]) || 28 || 24 || 27 || 27 || 26 || 19 
|-style="border-bottom: 3px solid grey;"
| colspan="2" align=left | Country's clubs were absent (=28 total editions-[4])|| — || 4 || 1 || 1 || 2 || 9 
|-
| colspan="2" align=left | Years/editions that country's clubs were absent || — || 1977 to 19811986 || 1993–94  (Last Cup) || 1983–84 || 1983 to 1985 || 1961 (First Cup)  1983 to 1988  1991–end
|-
| [5] || align=left style="font-size:100%" | Editions a club quit after playing at least one match || 1 || 5 || 1 || 4 || — || 1 
|-
| colspan="2" align=left | Editions a club withdrew or quit (=[2]+[5]) || 1 || 10 || 1 || 5 || — || 2 
|-style="border-bottom: 3px solid grey;"
| [6] || align=left | Editions with double entry || 8 || 5 || 6 || 3 || 1 || — 
|-
| [7] || align=left | Total entries (=[4]-[3]+[6]) || 36 || 28 || 33 || 29 || 27 || 19 
|-
| [8] || align=left | Cups won || 9 || 3 || 5 || 6 || 1 || 4 
|-bgcolor="ccffcc"
| colspan="2" align=left | % success in winning the Cup (=[8]÷[7]×100) || 25% || 11% || 15% || 21% || 4% || 21% 
|-
| [9] || align=left | Finals reached ||  15  || 4 ||  11 || 9 || 4 || 9 
|-
| colspan="2" align=left | % success in reaching the final <small>(=[9]÷[7]×100)</small> || 42% || 14% || 33% || 31% || 15% || 47%''' 
|}
Despite the fact that in each edition there was at least one Turkish side initially entering, in no less than 5 occasions it withdrew before playing a single match and in 5 more quit during group stage, after unsuccessful results. Greeks followed with 1 withdrawal and 4 quits, while clubs from all countries had sporadically terminated their participation in some early stage of the competition, except for Albanian. Multiple winner and several other records holder Beroe Stara Zagora, became the only Bulgarian side ever to withdraw or quit a Balkans Cup match and the single one to do so in a final, by not showing up for 1970 edition's return leg against Partizani Tirana of Albania, following a 1–1 draw at home.

 See also 
Mitropa Cup
Latin Cup

 References 

External links
 Balkans Cup Archive, Romeo Ionescu, RSSSF (Recreation & Sports Soccer Statistics Foundation) Balkans Cup, Mehmet Çelik, Turkish Soccer''

 
Defunct international club association football competitions in Europe
Bulgarian football friendly trophies
Greek football friendly trophies
Romanian football friendly trophies
Turkish football friendly trophies
Yugoslav football friendly trophies
Sport in the Balkans